The 2020 Louisiana–Monroe Warhawks baseball team represented the University of Louisiana at Monroe during the 2020 NCAA Division I baseball season. The Warhawks played their home games at Warhawk Field and were led by third year head coach Michael Federico. They were members of the Sun Belt Conference.

On March 12, the Sun Belt Conference announced the indefinite suspension of all spring athletics, including baseball, due to the increasing risk of the COVID-19 pandemic. Soon after, the Sun Belt cancelled all season and postseason play.

Preseason

Signing Day Recruits

Sun Belt Conference Coaches Poll
The Sun Belt Conference Coaches Poll was released on January 30, 2020 and the Warhawks were picked to finish fifth in the West Division with 25 total votes.

Preseason All-Sun Belt Team & Honors
Drake Nightengale (USA, Sr, Pitcher)
Zach McCambley (CCU, Jr, Pitcher)
Levi Thomas (TROY, Jr, Pitcher)
Andrew Papp (APP, Sr, Pitcher)
Jack Jumper (ARST, Sr, Pitcher)
Kale Emshoff (LR, RS-Jr, Catcher)
Kaleb DeLatorre (USA, Sr, First Base)
Luke Drumheller (APP, So, Second Base)
Hayden Cantrelle (LA, Jr, Shortstop)
Garrett Scott (LR, RS-Sr, Third Base)
Mason McWhorter (GASO, Sr, Outfielder)
Ethan Wilson (USA, So, Outfielder)
Rigsby Mosley (TROY, Jr, Outfielder)
Will Hollis (TXST, Sr, Designated Hitter)
Andrew Beesley (ULM, Sr, Utility)

Roster

Coaching staff

Schedule and results

Schedule Source:
*Rankings are based on the team's current ranking in the D1Baseball poll.

References

Louisiana–Monroe
Louisiana–Monroe Warhawks baseball seasons
Louisiana–Monroe Warhawks baseball